Nana Amaniampong Marfo (born 6 March 1957) is a Ghanaian politician and member of the 6th Parliament of the Fourth Republic of Ghana.

Education and early life
Marfo obtained his GCE O level certificate from Tetrem School and his GCE A level from St. Augustine's College, Cape Coast. He earned a BSc Admin in Finance and Management and MBA in Marketing at the University of Ghana.

Personal life
Marfo hails from Tetrem-Afigya in the Ashanti Region of Ghana. He is married with two children.

He is a Christian (Baptist).

Politics
Nana is a Ghanaian politician and a member of the Seventh Parliament of the Fourth Republic of Ghana representing the Afigya-Kwabre North Constituency in the Ashanti region of Ghana on the ticket of the New Patriotic Party.

Employment
After completing his studies at the University of Ghana in 1989, Marfo worked as a national service personnel at National Mobilization. From 1991 to 1994 he was a Senior Superintendent at the Ghana Education Service (GES). A year after leaving GES, he was appointed senior manager of the Ghana Commercial Bank working as the SME head of the Northern Sector. He served in that capacity from 1995 to 2012. From 2009 to 2012 he doubled as a lecturer at the University College of Education.

References

Ghanaian MPs 2017–2021
1957 births
Living people
New Patriotic Party politicians